Joseph Albert Vance (September 16, 1905 – July 4, 1978) was a Major League Baseball pitcher.

Vance also played 11 games for the football Brooklyn Dodgers in 1931 as a running back. Speaking in 1943, pitcher Max Macon of the baseball Dodgers, against whom Vance had competed in both the American Association and International League, called his former mound opponent the fastest man he'd ever seen.

References

Sources

Major League Baseball pitchers
Chicago White Sox players
New York Yankees players
American football running backs
Brooklyn Dodgers (NFL) players
Macon Peaches players
Muskogee Chiefs players
Independence Producers players
San Antonio Indians players
San Antonio Missions players
Dallas Steers players
Toronto Maple Leafs (International League) players
Kansas City Blues (baseball) players
Birmingham Barons players
Newark Bears (IL) players
Albany Senators players
Baseball players from Texas
People from Devine, Texas
1905 births
1978 deaths
Texas State Bobcats baseball players